Scantraxx Special is a sublabel of Dutch record label Scantraxx. Scantraxx Silver was one of the earlier Scantraxx sub-labels, founded it 2004. It focuses on hardstyle music like Scantraxx, and has releases by artists like DJ Duro, JDX, and Frontliner. Headhunterz made his debut on Scantraxx through Scantraxx Special with his release of "The Sacrifice".

References

Dutch record labels
Record labels established in 2004